Edward Wallace Lewis (born 24 December 1936) is an Australian politician.

He was born in Sydney, and was a shearer and farmer before entering politics. He travelled widely before settling in Hamilton around 1963, becoming secretary of the local branch of the Australian Workers' Union and president of the Hamilton Labor Party branch. In 1970 he was elected to the Victorian Legislative Assembly as the member for Dundas, but he was defeated in 1973.

References

1936 births
Living people
Australian Labor Party members of the Parliament of Victoria
Members of the Victorian Legislative Assembly
Politicians from Sydney